Richmond River High Campus, part of The Rivers Secondary College, is a dual-campus government-funded co-educational comprehensive secondary day school campus, located in North Lismore, in the Northern Rivers region of New South Wales, Australia. 

Established in 1958 as Richmond River High School, the campus enrolled approximately 720 students in 2018, from Year 7 to Year 12, of whom eight percent identified as Indigenous Australians and six percent were from a language background other than English. The school is operated by the NSW Department of Education; the principal is Dot Penaretos.

Overview 
It also is commonly affected by floods. The mission statement of the campus is "A Caring School of Excellence"; and the campus motto is "Knowledge is life".

The Rivers Secondary College comprises the Richmond River High Campus, the Kadina High Campus, and the Lismore High Campus.

See also 

 List of government schools in New South Wales
 Education in Australia

References

External links
 
 NSW Schools website

1958 establishments in Australia
Public high schools in New South Wales
Educational institutions established in 1958
Lismore, New South Wales